DYB or Dyb may refer to:
 Summerville Airport, the FAA LID code DYB
 ISO 639:dyb, the ISO 639 code for the Jabirr Jabirr language
 Grete Dyb, a Norwegian psychiatrist and terrorism researcher

See also 
 Dyb dyb dyb